The following list is the complete filmography of the American actor, director, producer, and screenwriter Jon Favreau.

Acting credits

Film

Television

Video games

Web

Filmmaking credits

Film

Executive producer only
 The Big Empty (2003)
 The Avengers (2012)
 Iron Man 3 (2013)
 Avengers: Age of Ultron (2015)
 Avengers: Infinity War (2018)
 Avengers: Endgame (2019)
 Alien Xmas (2020)

Television

References

External links
 

Male actor filmographies
Director filmographies
American filmographies